Lawrence or Larry Dahl may refer to:

Larry G. Dahl (1949–1971), US Army veteran and Medal of Honor recipient
Lawrence F. Dahl (born 1929), professor emeritus of chemistry at the University of Wisconsin–Madison

See also
Dahl (surname)